"Right Now" is a song written and recorded by American nu metal band Korn for their sixth studio album, Take a Look in the Mirror. It was released as the album's official first single in October 2003. It is usually used as an opening to Korn's concerts.

Concept

Chart performance
"Right Now" peaked at number 11 and number 13 on Billboard'''s Mainstream Rock Songs and Alternative Songs, respectively. The single was also released in the United Kingdom and Australia, but it failed to chart in both countries.

Charts

Music video

The video was chosen through an online contest which encouraged fans and independent directors to create the video from scratch. However, this version of "Right Now", by Internet user Junoon, never officially aired on television. A version containing grotesque animation from Lloyd's Lunchbox, a series of cartoons that were created by Spike & Mike's Animation, received heavy airplay on MTV2's Headbangers Ball, whereas a "mirror mix" directed by Nathan Cox was included on limited pressings of Take a Look in the Mirror.

The Lunchbox version of the video depicts Lloyd, a mentally-ill boy who does such harmful and gross things to his body, such as squeezing his eyeball, removing his fingernails, eating the pus from his acne, and sneezing out his lungs. At the end, Lloyd's skull is pulled out when he swings the door shut with a string tied to his teeth.

Appearances in media
The song was used in the Xbox video game MechAssault 2: Lone Wolf, played during the credits and during the final boss battle. The song is also on the soundtrack to A Man Apart.
The song was used for a WWE Wrestlemania 25 promo, and also appears in the video game Fight Club''.

Notes

External links

Korn songs
2003 singles
2003 songs
Epic Records singles
Songs written by Reginald Arvizu
Songs written by Jonathan Davis
Songs written by James Shaffer
Songs written by David Silveria
Songs written by Brian Welch